Zakef katan
 Rosanne Katon - an American model, actress, comedian and activist
 Michael Katon - an American blues-rock guitarist and vocalist